Tomoko Nagatomo (born 1972) is a Japanese archaeologist. She is a professor at Ritsumeikan University in Kyoto, Japan.

Biography 
Nagatomo was born in Kyoto. She studied at Osaka University, completing a Ph.D. in literature. She was an associate professor at Osaka Ohtani University.

Nagatomo studies the Yayoi and Kofun periods, particularly the equipment production and food culture of these periods.

References 

Living people
1972 births
Osaka University alumni